Aleknagik Airport , also known as Aleknagik (New) Airport, is a state-owned, public-use airport located one nautical mile (1.85 km) east of the central business district of Aleknagik, a city in the Dillingham Census Area of the U.S. state of Alaska.

This airport is included in the FAA's National Plan of Integrated Airport Systems for 2009–2013, which categorizes it as a general aviation facility. The airport formerly had scheduled service provided by PenAir with flights to Dillingham.

It has a single runway and an FAA location identifier of 5A8, while Aleknagik Seaplane Base uses an FAA identifier of Z33.

Facilities and aircraft 
It has one runway designated 15/33 with a gravel and dirt surface measuring 2,040 by 80 feet (622 x 24 m). For the 12-month period ending December 31, 2008, the airport had 2,500 aircraft operations, an average of 208 per month: 60% air taxi and 40% general aviation.

Airlines and destinations

Statistics

References

External links
 FAA Alaska airport diagram (GIF)

Airports in the Dillingham Census Area, Alaska